Love Pain Kuch Bhi Karega is a 2016 Indian Odia-language drama film directed by Ashok Pati and produced by Tarang Cine Productions.  It stars Babushan and Supriya Nayak in the lead roles while Usasi Mishra and Mihir Das play supporting roles.

Plot
The movie is based on a love story, where actor Babushan falls in love with a teenage girl.

The love affair of Sanju and Parinita is not approved by her father, who has fixed her marriage with the captain of a cricket team. In order to win her hand, Sanju has to play a match against him.

Cast

 Babushan as Sanju
 Supriya Nayak as Parinita 
 Usasi Mishra
 Mihir Das

References 

2016 films
2010s Odia-language films
2016 romantic drama films
Indian romantic drama films
Films directed by Ashok Pati